Flavobacterium cheonhonense  is a bacterium from the genus of Flavobacterium which has been isolated from water from the Cheonho reservoir from Cheonan in Korea.

References

cheonhonense
Bacteria described in 2014